Sir Bruce Warner is a fictional character on the New Zealand soap opera Shortland Street. He was portrayed by Ken Blackburn and was introduced as Chris Warner's (Michael Galvin) womanizing father.

The character of Bruce was written with antagonistic characteristics, with his storylines often focusing on his rivalry with CEO Michael McKenna (Paul Gittins) and his attempts at taking over the hospital. He would often go behind his families backs and either try buy out the hospital or indulge in numerous affairs. Bruce's wish was finally granted in 1995 when Michael retired, however only after signing the ownership deal of the hospital did Bruce realize Michael had the last laugh as Bruce was shafted from any managerial positions, only being a silent partner.

Bruce's arrogant persona alongside his constant womanizing, had a severe effect on both of his sons with Chris becoming the mirror image of his father and Guy (Craig Parker) blaming Bruce for his drug addiction.

Creation and casting
Ken Blackburn was cast in the sporadic role of Chris Warner's father Bruce. Blackburn struggled consistently throughout his stints with the writers for what he saw an unnecessary antagonism in the character of Bruce. He found Bruce unrealistically "abrasive" and hugely impolite. The character was eventually killed off following a stint of several episodes in 1995.

Storylines
Sir Bruce visits his son Chris (Michael Galvin) in and attempted to purchase the clinic to no success. He returns and invested money into a new private ward and carried out a union vote to implement him as the new Chief Executive Officer of the hospital. Even with the help of Hone Ropata (Temuera Morrison), Bruce fell short and remained a share holder. Bruce confronts Michael (Paul Gittins) following the poaching of Grace Kwan (Lynette Forday) from his hospital. Bruce soon admitted to being in love with her, straining his marriage to Margot (Glynis McNicoll) even further. The following year Bruce learned he was going to be a grandfather when his son Guy's (Craig Parker) girlfriend Carmen (Theresa Healey) fell pregnant. However Bruce was diagnosed with terminal cancer and dropped the bombshell that Guy was the product of an affair. Bruce dies and Nick Harrison (Karl Burnett) claims Bruce had retracted his will on his deathbed.

Later in 2003 Margot returned to town shortly after Toni Thompson's (Laura Hill) brother Dominic (Shane Cortese) arrived. The two claimed that Dom was the product of an affair Bruce had, thus making him Chris' brother. However it soon turned out not to be the case and Dom ended up trying to murder Chris.

Then in 2012 Marj Brasch (Elizabeth McRae) praised Bruce for his determination to set up the clinic alongside Michael.

Reception
Blackburn found portraying the character in such an antagonistic manner saw a lot of negative response, something he did not mind as it was expected. Michael Galvin (Chris Warner) found filming Bruce's final storyline that saw his health deteriorate, difficult, as his own father was going through a similar experience. He later recounted this as one of his worst moments on the soap.

References

Shortland Street characters
Fictional physicians
Fictional surgeons
Television characters introduced in 1992
Male characters in television